Singapore was first represented in France in 1974, by Abdul Aziz Bin Mahmood as the Chargé d’Affaires ad interim.

This is a list of ambassadors of Singapore to the France

See also
France–Singapore relations

Notes

References

External links
 Embassy of Singapore in France

 
Singapore
France